The Chittagong Vikings are a franchise cricket team based in Chittagong, Bangladesh, which plays in the Bangladesh Premier League (BPL). They are one of the seven teams that are competing in the 2016-17 Bangladesh Premier League. Tamim Iqbal will continue as the captain of the team, with a drastic change in the management. Due to failure in previous season, contract of Marvan Atapattu was not renewed, and Mohammad Salahuddin was appointed as the coach, who coached defending champions Comilla Victorians last season. Chris Gayle, Dwayne Smith, Shoaib Malik and Grant Elliott were bought under the contract for the fourth season.

Player draft
The 2016 BPL draft was held on 30 September. Prior to the draft, the seven clubs signed 38 foreign players to contracts and each existing franchise was able to retain two home-grown players from the 2015 season. A total 301 players participated in the draft, including 133 local and 168 foreign players. 85 players were selected in the draft.

Player Transfers
Prior to the 2016 draft, a number of high-profile players moved teams. These included transfers between competing teams and due to the suspension of the Chris Gayle from the Barisal Bulls to the Chittagong Vikings.

Standings

 The top four teams will qualify for playoffs
  advanced to the Qualifier
  advanced to the Eliminator

Squad

Records

References 

Bangladesh Premier League